Hafning bei Trofaiach is a village and a former municipality in the district of Leoben in Styria, Austria. Since January 2013, it is part of the town Trofaiach.

References

Cities and towns in Leoben District